Nethers (also Neathers)  is an unincorporated community located in Madison County, Virginia, United States. It is the primary access point for Old Rag Mountain in Shenandoah National Park.

Corbin Cabin was listed on the National Register of Historic Places in 1989.

References

Unincorporated communities in Virginia
Unincorporated communities in Madison County, Virginia